Justine Lupe-Schomp is an American actress. She is known for her roles on Mr. Mercedes, Succession, Cristela, and The Marvelous Mrs. Maisel.

Early life
Lupe grew up in Denver, Colorado. She is a 2007 graduate of Denver School of the Arts theater program and 2011 graduate of the Juilliard School in New York City. Her grandmother, Kay Schomp, has a theater named after her at the Denver School of the Arts. Her father, John Lupe, is an exhibition specialist at the Denver Art Museum.

Career
Lupe starred on the ABC sitcom Cristela. Lupe's run on Cristela began with the second episode, as she replaced another actress who played Maddie in the pilot.

After recurring on the HBO series Succession in its first two seasons, Lupe was made a series regular for its third season.

Filmography

References

External links
 
 

American film actresses
American television actresses
Actresses from Denver
Actresses from Colorado
Juilliard School alumni
1989 births
Living people
21st-century American actresses